Gennady Gennadievich Nazarov (March 3, 1967, Moscow) is a  Soviet and Russian actor.

Biography
He graduated from the faculty of the Moscow theatrical fake artistic and technical school. Sovremennik Theatre worked as a graphic designer in the theater. He graduated from the acting department GITIS led by Mark Zakharov. He played a large number of roles in theater.

In the film debuted in 1994 in the role of Ivan Chonkin of film Life and Extraordinary Adventures of Private Ivan Chonkin.

A large number of the roles were played by Gennady Nazarov on television.

Most of the audience has no idea that genes are a serious kidney disease.

Selected filmography
 Life and Extraordinary Adventures of Private Ivan Chonkin (1994) as Ivan Chonkin
 Assia and the Hen with the Golden Eggs (1994) as Seryozha
 Thief (1995) as Oleg, lawyer
 What a Wonderful Game (1995) as  Kolya Rybkin
 Eagle and Tails (1995) as Vadik
 Barkhanov and His Bodyguard (1996) as Lyonya
From Hell to Hell (1997) as  Andrzej Sikorski
 Cops and Robbers (1997) as taxi driver
Composition for Victory Day (1997) as  Vova
 72 Meters (2007) as miner
Astronaut  Grandson's (2007) as Fyodor Vnukov, lonely painter 
 Red Fountains (2011) as dad

Awards and nominations
 Czech Lions (1995): Best Actor (Life and Extraordinary Adventures of Private Ivan Chonkin) — nomination
 Nika Awards (1996): Best Actor (What a Wonderful Game) — nomination

References

External links 
 

1967 births
Russian male actors
Soviet male actors
Living people
Male actors from Moscow
Russian Academy of Theatre Arts alumni